Mikhail Anatolyevich Malykhin (born 25 February 1986) is a former Russian professional football player.

Club career
He played in the Russian Football National League for FC Metallurg-Kuzbass Novokuznetsk in 2007.

External links
 
 

1986 births
Living people
Russian footballers
Association football defenders
FC Dynamo Moscow reserves players
FC Novokuznetsk players
FC MVD Rossii Moscow players